Barbara Braathen is an American art dealer, gallerist and curator. She owned galleries of contemporary art in New York from 1980 to 2005.

Biography 
Barbara Braathen was born in North Dakota in 1944. By the age of 14, she was creating and selling her own paintings. After receiving a B.A. in Art History from the University of California in Los Angeles in 1968, she was awarded the prestigious Chancellor's Fellowship, which afforded her four years of study, including one year of art-intensive travel to all museums in Europe. In 1973, she received her PhDc in Modern Art History.

From 1980 to 1983, she operated Braathen-Gallozzi Fine Art in New York City with partner Guillaume Gallozzi.  This later became the Barbara Braathen Gallery, which was active in Lower Manhattan until 1998. From 2000 to 2005, Braathen opened and ran The River Gallery in upstate New York.

Braathen's exhibitions encompassed urban artist Rammellzee, French performance/word artist Guy de Cointet, spiritual expressionist Hunt Slonem, surrealist poet Charles Henri Ford and actor-artist Fred Gwynne.  A main highlight of her career came in 1986 when she co-curated the exhibition, Surrealismo, at her own gallery with eminent art dealer Leo Castelli.

Her interests include studies on artist Wassily Kandinsky, symbolism and the spiritual in art. She is also an avid mineral collector.

References 

American art dealers
Year of birth missing (living people)
People from North Dakota
American women curators
American curators
Living people